Filip Bergevi (born 20 April 1994) is a Swedish tennis player.

Bergevi has a career high ATP singles ranking of 568 achieved in 2019. His career high ATP doubles ranking is 389 achieved in 2021.

Career
Bergevi made his ATP main draw debut at the 2012 Swedish Open in the doubles draw partnering Fred Simonsson. 

Bergevi played college tennis at the University of California, Berkeley.

ATP Challenger and ITF titles

Singles: 1 
{|
|-valign=top
|

Doubles: 10

{|
|-valign=top
|

References

External links
 
 

1994 births
Living people
Swedish male tennis players
People from Kristianstad Municipality
California Golden Bears men's tennis players
Sportspeople from Skåne County
21st-century Swedish people